Leimbach is a quarter in the district 2 in Zürich. It is located in the lower Sihl Valley (Sihltal).

It was formerly a municipality of its own, having been incorporated into Zürich in 1893.

Transportation 
Zürich Leimbach railway station is a stop of the Zürich S-Bahn on the line S4. It is a 10-minute ride from Zürich Hauptbahnhof.

Gallery

References 

District 2 of Zürich
Former municipalities of the canton of Zürich